Litmus Green are an American hardcore punk band from Southern California, United States, who played from 1991-2002 and 2009–2017. They play short, fast political themed songs. They were featured in the award winning documentary The Decline of Western Civilization III. Litmus Green reunited 2022 with new member Adam V on bass.

History 
The Litmus Green formed in 1991 from the ashes of a band called Media Children, of which Rev. Sean, Ed, and Rick were members and Mateo was a friend / roadie / groupie. When things got too heavy and serious between the members of MC they broke up; since Mateo was already playing bass for a side project called Aftermath with Ed and Rick it seemed only natural to form a band with Rev. Sean on vocals.

In September 2001, Larry (Resist & Exist) joined as a second guitarist. Litmus Green played what was thought would be the "last" show in October 2002, with Ron Martinez (Final Conflict, 46 Short) filling in on bass, at the Showcase Theatre in Corona, CA.

In 2009 the band was asked to get back together for a few shows. Things went well so the band decided to keep going. Nick (Jack’s Cold Sweat and an old Litmus roadie) joined on bass in mid 2010. In early 2013, Rick decided to hang up the drum sticks and Antonio Val joined as drummer that July.

Discography
1992 Demo
Hulk Smash
Mother Fuckin' Messiah
Circle That A (1995)
Do You Fear Something? (1996)
It Must Suck to Be You (1998)
Cockring (1999)
More Than Animals (2015)
S.O.P. (2020)

References

External links
Official site

Hardcore punk groups from California